David Monson could refer to: 

David Smith Monson (born 1945), American politician from Utah
David Monson (North Dakota politician) (born 1950)

See also
David Monsoh (born 1973), Ivorian record producer
David Monson Bunis (born 1952), American-Israeli academic
David Manson (disambiguation)
David Munson (disambiguation)